Peter Desnoyers (April 21, 1800 – March 6, 1880) was a businessman and politician from Detroit, Michigan, and served as an early State Treasurer of Michigan.

Early life
Peter Desnoyers was born on April 21, 1800 in Detroit, Michigan, the first child of Peter J. Desnoyers and his wife Marie Louise.  The younger Peter Desnoyers lived in Detroit during his childhood, and began a career as a merchant in 1821.

Desnoyers married Caroline Leib.  The couple had two children: Edmund and Emilie.  He later married Annie Hunt Whipple.  The couple had two daughters: Frances Agnes and Catherine M.

Public service
Desnoyers was elected county treasurer of Wayne County, Michigan in 1826, the first man to be elected to that position.  He was again elected treasurer in the next election, and was elected twice more later in life in 1843 and 1851.  In 1827 he was elected alderman of the city of Detroit, and in 1831 he was appointed a United States Marshal by President Andrew Jackson, a position he held until 1837.  In 1838 he was appointed city treasurer of Detroit, and in 1839 Governor Stevens T. Mason appointed him State Treasurer of Michigan, a post which he served until Mason left office in 1840.

In 1849, Desnoyers moved from Detroit to Hamtramck, Michigan.  In 1850 he was elected a member of the Michigan Constitutional Convention, and in 1867 was again a member of the Convention.

Peter Desnoyers died March 6, 1880.

References

1800 births
1880 deaths
Detroit City Council members
State treasurers of Michigan
United States Marshals
19th-century American politicians